Xfig is a free and open-source vector graphics editor which runs under the X Window System on most UNIX-compatible platforms.

In Xfig, figures may be drawn using objects such as circles, boxes, lines, spline curves, text, etc. It is also possible to import images in a number of formats, including JPEG, EPS, PostScript, and SVG. Those objects can be created, deleted, moved or modified. Attributes such as colors or line styles can be selected in various ways. For text, 35 fonts are available.

Xfig saves figures in its native text-only "Fig" format. Xfig has a facility to print figures to a PostScript printer, too.
A convenient feature is the PSTricks or PGF/TikZ packages code that allows a smooth integration of Xfig-generated images into LaTeX documents. However, through the EPS export facility, figures can be imbedded into groff documents also, when rendered to PostScript, e. g. though grops.

Most operations in Xfig are performed using the mouse, but some operations may also be performed using keyboard accelerators (shortcuts). The interface is designed for a three-button mouse, although it is also possible to use a two-button or a one-button mouse with appropriate emulation, for example on a Macintosh under OS X.

History 
Xfig was written by Supoj Sutanthavibul in 1985 for SunView. Ken Yap ported xfig to X11.  In 1989, Brian V. Smith added many features.  In 1991, Paul King added many features including overhauling the GUI for version 2.0.  In 1997, Tom Sato added Japanese text support, spell checker, and search/replace.

Imports 
Xfig can import various files as images:
Raster formats: GIF, JPEG, PCX, PNG, PPM, TIFF, XBM, and XPM
Vector graphics formats: EPS, PostScript

Exports 
Xfig can export into various formats:
Raster formats: GIF, JPEG, PNG, PPM, XBM, XPM, PCX, TIFF, SLD
Formats for printed documents: PostScript, PDF, HP-GL (printer control language used by Hewlett-Packard plotters),
Vector graphics formats: EPS, SVG, PIC, CGM, Metafont, MetaPost, EMF, Tk
LaTeX files: PGF/TikZ , PStricks

See also 

Ipe – A modern vector graphics editor in the spirit of Xfig (including, e.g., LaTeX support).
Tgif - An Xlib based 2D vector drawing tool very similar to Xfig.
Comparison of vector graphics editors
WinFIG

References

External links 

XFig Version 3.2.5 User Manual

Native Fig file format
WinFIG, an Xfig clone for Windows (shareware with demo version)

''Copied from the Xfig home page with formatting changes. For additional details, check the xfig documentation or home page at https://sourceforge.net/projects/mcj/

1985 software
Free diagramming software
Free vector graphics editors
Vector graphics editors for Linux
X Window programs